Tuluram Rajbanshi is a Nepalese politician, belonging to the Communist Party of Nepal (Unified Marxist-Leninist). He contested the 1994 legislative election in the Morang-1 constituency, standing against Nepali Congress candidate Girija Prasad Koirala. Rajbanshi came second with 12987 votes, against 21013 for Koirala.

Rajbanshi is the Vice-Chairman of the Morang District Development Council.

References

Communist Party of Nepal (Unified Marxist–Leninist) politicians
Living people
Year of birth missing (living people)
Rajbongshi people